The International Convention on Civil Liability for Oil Pollution Damage, 1969, renewed in 1992 and often referred to as the CLC Convention, is an international maritime treaty admistered by the International Maritime Organization that was adopted to ensure that adequate compensation would be available where oil pollution damage was caused by maritime casualties involving oil tankers (i.e. ships that carry oil as cargo).

Liability 
The convention introduces strict liability for shipowners.

In cases when the shipowner is deemed guilty of fault for an instance of oil pollution, the convention does not cap liability.

The 2000 Amendments

Adoption: 18 October 2000

Entry into force: 1 November 2003

The amendments raised the compensation limits by 50 percent compared to the limits set in the 1992 Protocol, as follows:  
For a ship not exceeding 5,000 gross tonnage, liability is limited to 4.51 million SDR (US$5.78 million)
For a ship 5,000 to 140,000 gross tonnage:  liability is limited to 4.51 million SDR plus 631 SDR for each additional gross tonne over 5,000
For a ship over 140,000 gross tonnage: liability is limited to 89.77 million SDR

The HNS Convention to compensation for damages occurring from spill of dangerous goods is based on the same legal framework.

Insurance 

If a ship carries more than 2000 tons of oil in cargo, CLC requires shipowners to maintain "insurance or other financial security" sufficient to cover the maximum liability for one oil spill

Coverage 
As of September 2016, 136 states, representing 97.5 per cent of the world fleet, are contracting parties to the CLC Protocol of 1992, which amends the original CLC Convention. Bolivia, North Korea, Honduras, and Lebanon—which are generally flag of convenience states—have not ratified the treaty.

The United States of America is not a signatory to CLC, despite considerable involvement in its formulation. This is due to significant nation legislation such as the Oil Pollution Act, 1990, so signing the CLC was deemed unnecessary.

See also
 International Convention on Civil Liability for Bunker Oil Pollution Damage
 United Nations Convention on the Law of the Sea
 International Convention on Liability and Compensation for Damage in Connection with the Carriage of Hazardous and Noxious Substances by Sea (HNS Convention)
 International Convention for the Prevention of Pollution from Ships (MARPOL)

References

1969 in the environment
1992 in the environment
Environmental treaties
Environmental impact of shipping
International Maritime Organization treaties
Law of the sea treaties
Liability treaties
Oil spills
Treaties of Albania
Treaties of Algeria
Treaties of Angola
Treaties of Antigua and Barbuda
Treaties of Argentina
Treaties of Australia
Treaties of Azerbaijan
Treaties of the Bahamas
Treaties of Bahrain
Treaties of Barbados
Treaties of Belgium
Treaties of Belize
Treaties of the People's Republic of Benin
Treaties of Brunei
Treaties of Bulgaria
Treaties of Cambodia
Treaties of Cameroon
Treaties of Canada
Treaties of Cape Verde
Treaties of Chile
Treaties of the People's Republic of China
Treaties of Colombia
Treaties of the Comoros
Treaties of the Republic of the Congo
Treaties of the Cook Islands
Treaties of Ivory Coast
Treaties of Croatia
Treaties of Cyprus
Treaties of Denmark
Treaties of Djibouti
Treaties of Dominica
Treaties of the Dominican Republic
Treaties of Ecuador
Treaties of Egypt
Treaties of El Salvador
Treaties of Estonia
Treaties of Fiji
Treaties of Finland
Treaties of France
Treaties of Gabon
Treaties of Georgia (country)
Treaties of Germany
Treaties of Ghana
Treaties of Greece
Treaties of Grenada
Treaties of Guatemala
Treaties of Guinea
Treaties of Hungary
Treaties of Iceland
Treaties of India
Treaties of Indonesia
Treaties of Iran
Treaties of Ireland
Treaties of Israel
Treaties of Italy
Treaties of Jamaica
Treaties of Japan
Treaties of Jordan
Treaties of Kenya
Treaties of Kiribati
Treaties of Kuwait
Treaties of Latvia
Treaties of Lebanon
Treaties of Liberia
Treaties of Lithuania
Treaties of Luxembourg
Treaties of Madagascar
Treaties of Malaysia
Treaties of the Maldives
Treaties of Malta
Treaties of the Marshall Islands
Treaties of Mauritania
Treaties of Mauritius
Treaties of Mexico
Treaties of Moldova
Treaties of Mongolia
Treaties of Montenegro
Treaties of Morocco
Treaties of Mozambique
Treaties of Myanmar
Treaties of Namibia
Treaties of the Netherlands
Treaties of New Zealand
Treaties of Nicaragua
Treaties of Nigeria
Treaties of Niue
Treaties of Norway
Treaties of Oman
Treaties of Pakistan
Treaties of Palau
Treaties of Panama
Treaties of Papua New Guinea
Treaties of Peru
Treaties of the Philippines
Treaties of Portugal
Treaties of Qatar
Treaties of South Korea
Treaties of Romania
Treaties of Russia
Treaties of Saint Kitts and Nevis
Treaties of Saint Lucia
Treaties of Saint Vincent and the Grenadines
Treaties of Samoa
Treaties of Saudi Arabia
Treaties of Senegal
Treaties of Serbia
Treaties of Seychelles
Treaties of Sierra Leone
Treaties of Singapore
Treaties of Slovenia
Treaties of the Solomon Islands
Treaties of South Africa
Treaties of Spain
Treaties of Sri Lanka
Treaties of Sweden
Treaties of Switzerland
Treaties of Syria
Treaties of Togo
Treaties of Tonga
Treaties of Trinidad and Tobago
Treaties of Tunisia
Treaties of Turkey
Treaties of Turkmenistan
Treaties of Tuvalu
Treaties of the United Arab Emirates
Treaties of the United Kingdom
Treaties of Tanzania
Treaties of Uruguay
Treaties of Vanuatu
Treaties of Venezuela
Treaties of Vietnam
Treaties of Yemen
Treaties concluded in 1969
Treaties entered into force in 1975
Treaties concluded in 1992
Treaties entered into force in 1996
1969 in London
1992 in London
Treaties extended to Anguilla
Treaties extended to Guernsey
Treaties extended to Jersey
Treaties extended to the Isle of Man
Treaties extended to Bermuda
Treaties extended to the British Virgin Islands
Treaties extended to the Cayman Islands
Treaties extended to the Falkland Islands
Treaties extended to Gibraltar
Treaties extended to Montserrat
Treaties extended to the Pitcairn Islands
Treaties extended to Saint Helena, Ascension and Tristan da Cunha
Treaties extended to the Turks and Caicos Islands
Treaties extended to Akrotiri and Dhekelia
Treaties extended to Aruba
Treaties extended to the Netherlands Antilles
Treaties extended to the British Antarctic Territory
Treaties extended to British Honduras
Treaties extended to British Hong Kong
Treaties extended to the Gilbert and Ellice Islands
Treaties extended to the Crown Colony of Seychelles
Treaties extended to the British Solomon Islands